The Marshall Thundering college football team represents Marshall University in the East Division of the Conference USA (C-USA). The Thundering Herd competes as part of the National Collegiate Athletic Association (NCAA) Division I Football Bowl Subdivision. The program has had 30 head coaches since it began play during the 1895 season. Since January 2021, Charles Huff has served as Marshall's head coach.

Key

Coaches

Notes

References

Lists of college football head coaches

Marshall Thundering Herd football coaches